The 2000–01 NCAA Division I men's ice hockey season began on October 6, 2000 and concluded with the 2001 NCAA Division I Men's Ice Hockey Tournament's championship game on April 7, 2001 at the Pepsi Arena in Albany, New York. This was the 54th season in which an NCAA ice hockey championship was held and is the 107th year overall where an NCAA school fielded a team.

Pre-season polls

The top 20 from USCHO.com/CBS College Sports and the top 15 from USA Today/American Hockey Magazine.

Regular season

Season tournaments

Standings

2001 NCAA Tournament

Note: * denotes overtime period(s)

Player stats

Scoring leaders
The following players led the league in points at the conclusion of the season.

  
GP = Games played; G = Goals; A = Assists; Pts = Points; PIM = Penalty minutes

Leading goaltenders
The following goaltenders led the league in goals against average at the end of the regular season while playing at least 33% of their team's total minutes.

GP = Games played; Min = Minutes played; W = Wins; L = Losses; OT = Overtime/shootout losses; GA = Goals against; SO = Shutouts; SV% = Save percentage; GAA = Goals against average

Awards

NCAA

CCHA

CHA

ECAC

Hockey East

MAAC

WCHA

See also
 2000–01 NCAA Division III men's ice hockey season

References

External links
USCHO.com 
College Hockey Historical Archives
College Hockey Stats.net

 
NCAA